Isabelle Demongeot and Natalia Medvedeva were the defending champions, but none competed this year.

Cammy MacGregor and Catherine Suire won the title by defeating Patty Fendick and Meredith McGrath 6–3, 7–6(7–3) in the final.

Seeds

Draw

Draw

References

External links
 Official results archive (ITF)
 Official results archive (WTA)

Doubles
Volvo Women's Open - Doubles
 in women's tennis